Cooks Creek Aerodrome  is located  east northeast of Cooks Creek, Manitoba, Canada.

References

Registered aerodromes in Manitoba